The 2018 UNAF U-15 Tournament is the second edition of the UNAF U-15 Tournament. The tournament took place in Algeria from 11 to 15 April 2018. The start of the tournament was scheduled for 11 April but was postponed to 12 April.

Participants

Venues
Stade Akid Lotfi, Tlemcen

Squads

Tournament

Goalscorers
4 goals
 Mohamed Adel Ramadan

2 goal
 Adil Boulbina

1 goal

 Mohamed Rayan Gacem
 Mohamed Amine Benali
 Nafaa Lamine

References

External links
2018 UNAF U-15 Tournament - FAF official website

2018 in African football
2018
2018
2018 in Algerian sport